Dash Aghlian Mosque is related to the Qajar dynasty and is located in Khoy, Shahid Samadzadeh Street.

References

Mosques in Iran
Mosque buildings with domes
National works of Iran